Brymir is a Finnish melodic death metal/symphonic metal band from Helsinki founded in 2006.

Biography 
They were formed in the summer of 2006 during a music summer camp under the name LAI LAI HEI (named of the Ensiferum track of the same name). After the win of a camp-competition covering the Ensiferum track "Token of Time", the band quickly became more serious and started to compose their own music under the current name Brymir. Their first album Breathe Fire to the Sun (2011) still held some folk metal influences, but the band has moved away from these influences in their music towards their current melodic death metal / symphonic metal sound from their second album Slayer of Gods (2016) onwards.

Members

Current 
 Viktor Gullichsen – lead vocals (2006–)
 Joona Björkroth – guitars, backing vocals (2006–)
 Sean Haslam – guitars (2006–)
 Jarkko Niemi – bass, vocals (2006–)
 Patrik Fält – drums (2013–)

Past members 
 Jaakko Tikkanen – drums (2006–2010)
 Sami Hänninen – drums (2010–2013)
 Janne Björkroth – keyboard, backing vocals (2006–2018)

Live musicians 
 Petri Mäkipää – drums (2013)
 Antti Nieminen – guitars (2017–)

Discography

Studio albums 
 Breathe Fire to the Sun (Spinefarm Records) – 2011
 Slayer of Gods – 2016
 Wings of Fire – 2019
 Voices in the Sky (Napalm Records) – 2022

Singles 
 "For Those Who Died" (2016)
 "The Rain" (2016)
 "Chasing the Skyline" (2018)
 "Ride On, Spirit" (2018)
 "Wings of Fire" (2019)
 "Voices in the Sky" (2022)
 "Herald of Aegir" (2022)

References

External links 
 

Finnish folk metal musical groups
Finnish symphonic metal musical groups
Finnish melodic death metal musical groups
Musical groups established in 2006
Musical groups from Helsinki